The European Individual Chess Championship 2013 was a chess 11-round Swiss-system tournament, played between 4 and 17 May 2013, in Legnica, Poland.  Ukrainian grandmaster Alexander Moiseenko won the gold medal after tie break.

Format
Players had 90 minutes for their first 40 moves followed by 30 minutes for the rest of the game with an additional increment of 30 seconds per move from move one. 

The tie breaks were calculated as follows:
Average Rating cut-1, the highest number wins;
Buchholz cut-1, the highest number wins;
Buchholz, the highest number wins;
Number of wins, the highest number wins.

The best 23 players qualified for the Chess World Cup 2013.

Participants
The players were nominated by their respective national chess federations. The 10 highest ranked participants with their May 2013 rating (Continent Rank Europe position) were:

, 2731 (15)
, 2719 (20)
, 2718 (21)
, 2710 (24)
, 2709
, 2706
, 2704
, 2702
, 2700 (35)
, 2698

All of the above are grandmasters.

Winners
Ten players finished on 8/11 points to tie for first place. After applying tie-breaks, the following players were awarded the gold, silver and bronze medal positions;

References

External links
XIV European Individual Chess Championship: Official site
Chess-Results: European Individual Chess Championship 2013

European Championship
Chess in Poland
2013 in Polish sport
Legnica
Supranational chess championships